Albert Freethy (27 April 1885 – 17 July 1966) was a Welsh rugby union referee and first-class cricketer. He was born in Swansea and died in Cimla.

Freethy played his debut Minor Counties match in 1908, though he would only occasionally play in the period immediately before the war, notching up seven Minor Counties appearances before 1914. Freethy returned to the Minor Counties arena during 1920, and in Glamorgan's debut first-class season of 1921, which turned out to be his last in the County game, picked up three first-class appearances.

Following Freethy's retirement from cricket, he would further pursue his love of rugby, becoming one of the great rugby union referees of the period, taking charge of eighteen tests between 1923 and 1931. During the 1924-25 tour by the New Zealand Invincibles, he sent off Cyril Brownlie during the England-New Zealand test, the first time a player had been sent off from a test. Freethy  later served on Glamorgan's committee in the 1930s.

External links
Albert Freethy at Cricket Archive 

1885 births
1966 deaths
Cricketers from Swansea
Welsh cricketers
Glamorgan cricketers
Welsh rugby union referees
Rugby union players from Swansea